The 1994 Women's World Fistball Championships was held from the 7th to 9 of September 1994 in Buenos Aires, Argentina.
Is the first Women's Fistball World Championship.

Final standings

External links 
 

Fistball World Championships
F
 Sports competitions in Buenos Aires